is a Japanese ice hockey player for Seibu Princess Rabbits and the Japanese national team. She participated at the 2015 IIHF Women's World Championship.

Nakamura competed at both the 2014 and the 2018 Winter Olympics.

References

1987 births
Living people
Ice hockey players at the 2014 Winter Olympics
Ice hockey players at the 2018 Winter Olympics
Japanese women's ice hockey forwards
Olympic ice hockey players of Japan
Place of birth missing (living people)
Asian Games medalists in ice hockey
Ice hockey players at the 2011 Asian Winter Games
Ice hockey players at the 2017 Asian Winter Games
Medalists at the 2011 Asian Winter Games
Medalists at the 2017 Asian Winter Games
Asian Games gold medalists for Japan
Asian Games silver medalists for Japan